FPT Software Company Limited, or simply FPT Software, is a global IT services provider headquartered in Hanoi, Vietnam, being the core subsidiary of the FPT Corporation. It is considered as one of the biggest software services company in Vietnam, with revenue of $513.6 million (FY2020) and workforce of 18,000 employees.

History 

FPT Software was founded in 1999 by 13 members of FPT Group, led by Nguyen Thanh Nam (later CEO, Chairman of FPT Software then CEO of FPT Group). In 2000, it opened two first oversea branches in Silicon Valley, US and Bangalore, India; both closed after one year due to lack of customers. The FPT Board of Directors decided to shift the direction to Japan market, which boosted the growth of the company. In 2005, FPT opened its first branch in Japan and Singapore, then expanded to Paris, France and reopened US's branch in 2008. The company also opened its domestic delivery center in Ho Chi Minh City (2004), and in Da Nang (2005).

In 2009, FPT Software was re-organized as a joint-stock company, with the newly appointed Chairman Nguyen Thanh Nam (Former FPT Software CEO) and CEO Bui Thi Hong Lien (former CEO FPT India and former CEO FPT Japan).

In 2012, FPT Software has the first major organization shift, with changes in the Board of Directors, business model (from multiple subsidiary companies to delivery centers and oversea branches), and strategy (from traditional information technology outsourcing (ITO) services to third platform (SMAC)-oriented services). By the end of 2013, FPT Software reached $100 million of revenue and 5,000 employees.

In June 2014, FPT Software acquired RWE IT Slovakia, an IT Business Unit of RWE, becoming the first Vietnamese IT company to conduct an overseas merger and acquisition. The deal helped FPT Software access to the energy management domain and know-how in SAP technologies with more than 400 local experts. In 2016, FPT Software reached $230 million of revenue and 10,000 employees, which put the company comparable to India Top 20 IT Services companies. FPT Japan also achieved the revenue of $126 million, becoming the first Oversea Branch of FPT Software to cross over $100 million revenue.

In 2017, sponsored by FPT Group Chairman Trương Gia Bình, the company launched its major campaigns of digital transformation and whale hunting strategy, which helped the company to establish relations with more than 40 major global corporations, of which more than 20 are Fortune Global 500 companies such as Airbus, Siemens, UPS, etc. By the end of 2017, FPT Software had 75 partners in Fortune Global 500. In July 2018, FPT Software acquired 90% of Intellinet, an US-based consulting firm with 150 high-level consultants with revenue of $30 million. The deal was estimated to reach $45–50 million when FPT Software acquired the remaining 10% in the next three years. FPT Japan reached the pool of 1,000 employees (not including offshore), becoming the biggest Vietnamese company in Japan and ranked among Top 40 Japanese IT companies.

Operations 
Excluding back office department, FPT Software's delivery units can be divided according to three divisions: nine sales divisions to supervise oversea markets, 14 business divisions in specific vertical industries and products, and ten development divisions in charge of developing business in specific services.

Services and offering 
FPT Software's services and offering portfolio offers three main services: digital consulting services, digital technology services, and  outsourcing services.

Key domains 
FPT Software focuses on six major industries: manufacturing and automotive, utilities and energy, banking financial services and insurance (BFSI), telecommunication and media, logistics and transportation, and healthcare.

List of Branches 
FPT Software has presence in 26 countries & territories with 59 offices.

Subsidiaries

Acquisitions

References 

Companies based in Hanoi
Software companies established in 1999
Software companies of Vietnam
Vietnamese brands
Vietnamese companies established in 1999